Vice-Admiral Sir Alfred Englefield Evans  (30 January 1884 – 29 December 1944) was an English Royal Navy officer and first-class cricketer. Evans was a right-handed batsman who bowled right-arm medium pace. He rose to the rank of vice-admiral during his career, which involved service in the First World War.

Biography

Evans was born in South Africa, the second son of Dr E. W. Evans. He spent his formative years in South Africa before the family returned to England, where he was educated at Horris Hill School before joining the Royal Navy. Evans was taught aboard the training ship HMS Britannia, and was appointed a midshipman in 1900. He was promoted to acting sub-lieutenant in 1901, and to Sub-Lieutenant in 1903. In 1905, he was promoted to lieutenant. He was promoted to Lieutenant-Commander in 1914, and fought at the Battle of Jutland, serving as flag-lieutenant to Vice-Admiral Sir Arthur Leveson. He was promoted Commander in 1917, and was appointed an OBE in 1919.

He was promoted to captain, to rear-admiral and finally to vice-admiral. He was appointed a Companion of the Bath in the 1937 Coronation Honours, and was appointed a Knight Commander of the Order of the British Empire in 1943, shortly before his death.

Evans died at Cranborne, Dorset on 29 December 1944.

Cricket career

Evans made his first-class debut for the Royal Navy against the Army in 1914 at Lord's. Following the end of the First World War, Evans played a further five times for the Royal Navy, with his final first-class appearance for the Navy coming against the Army in 1925: this match was also Evans' final first-class match.

In 1919 Evans made his debut for Hampshire against Surrey. From 1919 to 1920, Evans represented Hampshire in five first-class matches with his final appearance for the county coming against Middlesex in the 1921 County Championship.

In addition to representing Hampshire and the Royal Navy, Evans also made first-class appearances for a combined Army and Navy side against Demobilised Officers in 1919 and for a Combined Services side against the Gentlemen of England in 1920.

In Evans' first-class career he played thirteen matches, scoring 310 runs at a batting average of 14.09, with one half century and a high score of 77. With the ball Evans took 23 wickets at a bowling average of 36.56, with best figures of 4/74.

Family
Evan's brothers Dudley Evans and William Evans both played first-class cricket. In addition his cousin John Evans played Test cricket for England. Evan's cousin Ralph Evans and uncle Alfred Evans also played first-class cricket.

References

External links

1884 births
1944 deaths
Knights Commander of the Order of the British Empire
Companions of the Order of the Bath
English cricketers
Royal Navy vice admirals
Royal Navy cricketers
Royal Navy officers of World War I
Hampshire cricketers
Combined Services cricketers
Army and Navy cricketers
South African emigrants to the United Kingdom
South African military personnel